is a passenger railway station in the city of Shibukawa, Gunma Prefecture, Japan, operated by East Japan Railway Company (JR East).

Lines
Onogami Station is a station on the Agatsuma Line, and is located 11.9 rail kilometers from the terminus of the line at Shibukawa Station.

Layout
The station is unmanned and consists of two platforms connected by a footbridge. Platform 1 is a side platform. Platform 2 is an island platform; however, one side of the island platform is not in use.

Platforms

History
Onogami Station was opened on 20 November 1945. The station was absorbed into the JR East network upon the privatization of the Japanese National Railways (JNR) on 1 April 1987.

Surrounding area
 Onogami Onsen

External links

 JR East Station information 

Railway stations in Gunma Prefecture
Agatsuma Line
Stations of East Japan Railway Company
Railway stations in Japan opened in 1945
Shibukawa, Gunma